Konstantin Sergeyevich Lisenkov (born 22 June 1989) is a Paralympic swimmer from Russia competing mainly in category S8 events. He won a two gold, two silver and three bronze medals at the 2008 and 2012 Summer Paralympics. At the 2008 Games he set a new world records in the 100 m backstroke.

References

External links

 

1989 births
Living people
Russian male backstroke swimmers
Paralympic swimmers of Russia
Paralympic gold medalists for Russia
Paralympic silver medalists for Russia
Paralympic bronze medalists for Russia
Paralympic medalists in swimming
S8-classified Paralympic swimmers
Swimmers at the 2008 Summer Paralympics
Swimmers at the 2012 Summer Paralympics
Medalists at the 2008 Summer Paralympics
Medalists at the 2012 Summer Paralympics
Medalists at the World Para Swimming Championships
Medalists at the World Para Swimming European Championships
Russian male freestyle swimmers
Russian male medley swimmers
People from Engels, Saratov Oblast
Sportspeople from Saratov Oblast
20th-century Russian people
21st-century Russian people